Jean Paternotte (18 June 1931 – January 2009) was a Belgian boxer. He competed in the men's light welterweight event at the 1952 Summer Olympics.

References

External links
 

1931 births
2009 deaths
Belgian male boxers
Olympic boxers of Belgium
Boxers at the 1952 Summer Olympics
Place of birth missing
Light-welterweight boxers